Connecticut's 108th House of Representatives district elects one member of the Connecticut House of Representatives. It consists of the town of Sherman as well as parts of New Fairfield, Danbury and New Milford. It has been represented by Republican Patrick Callahan since 2021.

List of representatives

Recent elections

2022

2020

2018

2016

2014

2012

References

108